José Alfredo Quintero Ordóñez (born June 20, 1990) is an Ecuadorian footballer who plays as a defender or midfielder for Ecuadorian Serie A side L.D.U. Quito. He made his debut for Ecuador on 22 February 2017 in a match against the Honduras.

Honours
LDU Quito
Ecuadorian Serie A: 2018
Copa Ecuador: 2019
Supercopa Ecuador: 2020, 2021

References

1990 births
Living people
Ecuadorian footballers
Ecuadorian Serie A players
S.D. Aucas footballers
L.D.U. Quito footballers
Ecuador international footballers
People from Quinindé Canton
Association football midfielders
Association football defenders
2019 Copa América players